Rachell Sumpter (born November 18, 1982, in Los Angeles, California) is an internationally recognized illustrator and artist working in Seattle, Washington. A graduate of the Art Center College of Design, Sumpter's exhibitions have included solo exhibitions at the Richard Heller Gallery (Los Angeles), Hosfelt Gallery (New York City) Foley Gallery and Motel (Portland). Her work has also been showcased in group exhibitions at Jack Hanley Gallery (San Francisco), the Orange County Museum of Art and LACMA, among others. She currently teaches illustration, drawing and painting at a University in Seattle.

In addition to her exhibition work, Sumpter also maintains a commercial illustration practice. Her ongoing work with Dave Eggers and McSweeney's can be seen in the cover art for Zeitoun and What is the What. Her other clients include Chronicle Books, Penguin Books, Random House and the New York Times.

References

External links
 rachellsumpter.com

American illustrators
American children's book illustrators
American women illustrators
21st-century American painters
21st-century American women artists
American women painters
Living people
1982 births